Joaquín Ignacio Nicolás Gatica Jiménez (born 8 January 1986) is a Chilean former footballer who played as a defensive midfielder for clubs in Chile and abroad.

Club career
After taking part of the Colo-Colo youth system, Gatica came to Coquimbo Unido at the age of fifteen, coinciding with well-known players such as Carlos Carmona, Nicolás Crovetto, Alí Manouchehri, Mario Aravena, among others. He played after for Deportes Santa Cruz and Corporación Ñuñoa in the Chilean Tercera División.

In 2010, he went to Brazil thanks to the coach Francisco Cardoso, Quinho, and had stints with Bahia and Ipatinga.

After a brief stint with Provincial Osorno and being a member of San Antonio Unido, he emigrated to Central America alongside his fellows Salvatore Abarca and Víctor Retamal thanks to the coach José Valladares and joined Triomphe de Liancourt in the Ligue Haïtienne in 2011. Back in Chile, he played for Fernández Vial and Ñublense B.

In March 2013, he joined Thailand side Ayutthaya FC, being loaned to Trang FC in the same year.

He went on playing football at amateur level for clubs such as Nino Landa from Peñalolén, and Palestino from Chicureo, even taking part in the 2022 Copa Chile as a member of Unión Bellavista from Coquimbo.

After football
He keeps a friendship with some former fellows in Coquimbo Unido such as Carlos Carmona, Nicolás Crovetto and Alí Manouchehri.

He has served as head and coordinator of municipal deputations for the Municipality of Coquimbo.

References

External links
 
 
 

1986 births
Living people
Footballers from Santiago
Chilean footballers
Chilean expatriate footballers
Coquimbo Unido footballers
Deportes Santa Cruz footballers
Esporte Clube Bahia players
Ipatinga Futebol Clube players
Provincial Osorno footballers
San Antonio Unido footballers
C.D. Arturo Fernández Vial footballers
Ñublense footballers
Joaquin Gatica
Joaquin Gatica
Chilean Primera División players
Tercera División de Chile players
Campeonato Brasileiro Série B players
Primera B de Chile players
Ligue Haïtienne players
Segunda División Profesional de Chile players
Joaquin Gatica
Chilean expatriate sportspeople in Brazil
Chilean expatriate sportspeople in Haiti
Chilean expatriate sportspeople in Thailand
Expatriate footballers in Brazil
Expatriate footballers in Haiti
Expatriate footballers in Thailand
Association football midfielders